Joseph Stanton Jr. (July 19, 1739December 15, 1821) was a military officer, a United States senator of the Anti-Federalist faction and a United States Representative of the Democratic-Republican party.

Early life

Stanton was born in Charlestown in the Colony of Rhode Island and Providence Plantations in 1739.  During the French and Indian War he served in the expedition against Quebec 1759.  In June 1762 he was elected captain of the Artillery Company of Westerly, Charlestown and Hopkinton, an independent company of the Rhode Island Militia which still exists as the 169th Military Police Company.  He represented Charlestown in the Rhode Island General Assembly from 1768 to 1774 and again in 1776.

Military service
During the American Revolutionary War, Stanton was commissioned as the lieutenant colonel of the 1st Kings County Regiment of the Rhode Island Militia in July 1776.  He then served as the colonel of a regiment of state troops, raised for 15 months service, from December 12, 1776 until his resignation on November 10, 1777.   (The regiment was part of a brigade of two infantry and one artillery regiments which was formed to deter an invasion of the mainland portion of Rhode Island by the British forces occupying Newport.) 

In May 1779 he was appointed at the colonel of the 1st Kings County Regiment of the militia and was subsequently appointed a brigadier general in command of the Kings County Brigade of militia in October of the same year. In May 1788 he was promoted to major general in command of the entire Rhode Island Militia. He held this position until his resignation in October 1790.

Political career

He was a delegate to the Rhode Island Constitutional Convention in 1790, which ratified the United States Constitution and enabled Rhode Island to be the last of the 13 colonies to join the Union.

He was elected by the General Assembly to serve as one of the first two U.S. Senators from Rhode Island, and served from June 12, 1790 to March 3, 1793 as a member of the Anti-Administration Party (i.e. opposed to President George Washington).  He was later elected to the United States House of Representatives, where he served from March 4, 1801 to March 3, 1807 as a member of the Jeffersonian Democrat-Republican Party.

Stanton died in Lebanon, Connecticut in 1821 at the age of 82, and was buried in the Stanton family cemetery in Charlestown.

Legacy
There is a monument to Senator Stanton on US Route 1 in Charlestown, Rhode Island, in front of his birthplace, which is listed on the National Register of Historic Places.  The General Stanton Inn in Charlestown is named after him.

References

External links

Wilkins Updike, A History of the Episcopal Church in Narragansett, Rhode Island (Boston,  1907) has brief sketch of Stanton on p. 525

1739 births
1821 deaths
American militia generals
Rhode Island militiamen in the American Revolution
United States senators from Rhode Island
People from Washington County, Rhode Island
People of colonial Rhode Island
People of Rhode Island in the French and Indian War
Continental Army officers from Rhode Island
Democratic-Republican Party members of the United States House of Representatives from Rhode Island